The FIBT World Championships 1991 took place in Altenberg, Germany (Bobsleigh) and Igls, Austria (Skeleton). This was Altenberg's first time hosting a championship event. Igls was hosting its third, doing so previously in 1935 (Two-man) and 1963. It marked the first time a unified German team competed since World War II with East Germany and West Germany having been unified the previous year.

Two man bobsleigh

Four man bobsleigh

Men's skeleton

This was the first sweep in any event of the championships.

Medal table

References
2-Man bobsleigh World Champions
4-Man bobsleigh World Champions
Men's skeleton World Champions

1991
1991 in German sport
1991 in bobsleigh
1991 in skeleton
Sport in Altenberg, Saxony
International sports competitions hosted by Germany
Bobsleigh in Germany
1958 in German sport
International sports competitions hosted by Austria
Bobsleigh in Austria
1958 in Austrian sport
Skeleton in Austria
1990s in Saxony

de:Skeleton-Weltmeisterschaft 1991